December 5 - Eastern Orthodox liturgical calendar - December 7

All fixed commemorations below celebrated on December 19 by Eastern Orthodox Churches on the Old Calendar.

For December 6th, Orthodox Churches on the Old Calendar commemorate the Saints listed on November 23.

Saints
 Saint Theophilus, Bishop of Antioch (181)
 Martyr Niser, under Maximian, by fire (c. 286-305)
 Saint Nicholas the Wonderworker (Nicholas of Myra), Archbishop of Myra in Lycia (c. 345) 
 Saint Nicholas, Bishop of Patara, uncle of St. Nicholas of Myra (4th century)
 Saint Abramius, Bishop of Cratea (Kratia) in Bithynia (6th century)

Pre-Schism Western saints
 Saint Asella (406)
 Saints Auxilius, Isserninus and Secundinus, missionaries with St Patrick in the enlightenment of Ireland (5th century)
 Martyrs Dionysia, Dativa, Leontia, Tertius, Emilian, Boniface, Majoricus, and Servus, in North Africa under the Arian Vandal Hunneric (c. 484)
 Saint Gertrude the Elder, founder and first Abbess of Hamaye (Hamay, Hamage) near Douai, in north France (649)

Post-Schism Orthodox saints
 Blessed Maximus, Metropolitan of Kiev and all Rus (1305)
 New Martyr Nicholas of Karamania, in Asia Minor (1657)  (see also March 19)

New martyrs and confessors
 Hieromartyr Michael Uspensky, Priest of Moscow (1937)
 Hieromartyr Grigol Peradze of Georgia, Archimandrite, Hieromartyr (1942)

Other commemorations
 The miraculous apparition of St. Nicholas at the First Ecumenical Council (325)
 The Wonderworking icon of St. Nicholas the Drenched of St. Sophia's Cathedral in Kiev.
 Name Day of Royal Martyr Tsar Nicholas II (1918)

Icon gallery

Notes

References

Sources 
 December 6/19. Orthodox Calendar (pravoslavie.ru).
 December 19 / December 6. Holy Trinity Russian Orthodox Church (a parish of the Patriarchate of Moscow).
 December 6. OCA - The Lives of the Saints.
 December 6. Latin Saints of the Orthodox Patriarchate of Rome.
 The Roman Martyrology. Transl. by the Archbishop of Baltimore. Last Edition, According to the Copy Printed at Rome in 1914. Revised Edition, with the Imprimatur of His Eminence Cardinal Gibbons. Baltimore: John Murphy Company, 1916. pp. 375–376.
 Rev. Richard Stanton. A Menology of England and Wales, or, Brief Memorials of the Ancient British and English Saints Arranged According to the Calendar, Together with the Martyrs of the 16th and 17th Centuries. London: Burns & Oates, 1892. p. 587.
Greek Sources
 Great Synaxaristes:  6 Δεκεμβριου. Μεγασ Συναξαριστησ.
  Συναξαριστής. 6 Δεκεμβρίου. Ecclesia.gr. (H Εκκλησια Τησ ΕλλαδοΣσ. 
Russian Sources
 *  19 декабря (6 декабря). Православная Энциклопедия под редакцией Патриарха Московского и всея Руси Кирилла (электронная версия). (Orthodox Encyclopedia - Pravenc.ru).
  6 декабря (ст.ст.) 19 декабря 2013 (нов. ст.). Русская Православная Церковь Отдел внешних церковных связей. (DECR).

December in the Eastern Orthodox calendar